Bjarni Pálsson (17 May 1719 - 8 September 1779) was an Icelandic doctor and naturalist. On 18 March 1760 he was named the first Director of Health in Iceland.

Life
Bjarni was born in Upsum at Eyjafjörður to Páll Bjarnason and Sigríður Ásmundsdóttir.

From 1752 to 1757 he traveled around the country with his friend Eggert Ólafsson on a grant from the Danish state. A book that they subsequently wrote about the trip was published in 1772 under the title Journey through Iceland. It is a comprehensive representation of the country and its population at that time. The book was translated into German, French and English in the 19th century, but was not published until 1943 in Icelandic under the title Ferðabók Eggerts og Bjarna.

Bjarni was appointed Iceland's first Director of Health on March 18 1760 by a royal decree. As such, he first lived in Bessastaðir and later in Nes on Seltjarnarnes, where he died in 1779 at the age of 60.

References

Further reading

Travels in Iceland (Internet Archive) in English.

1719 births
1779 deaths
18th-century physicians
Bjarni Pálsson